Die Hard with a Vengeance is a 1995 American action thriller film directed by John McTiernan (who directed the first installment). It was written by Jonathan Hensleigh, based on the screenplay Simon Says by Hensleigh and on the characters created by Roderick Thorp for his 1979 novel Nothing Lasts Forever. Die Hard with a Vengeance is the third film in the Die Hard film series, after Die Hard 2 (1990). It is followed by Live Free or Die Hard (2007) and A Good Day to Die Hard (2013).

The film stars Bruce Willis as NYPD Lieutenant John McClane and Samuel L. Jackson as McClane's reluctant partner Zeus Carver, who team up to stop bomb threats across New York City carried out by "Simon" (Jeremy Irons). It was released on May 19, 1995 to mixed reviews and became the highest-grossing film of the year. The film later gained a cult following and has been considered by many critics and fans as the best sequel of the franchise.

Plot 
The Bonwit Teller department store in New York City is blown up by a bomb during the morning commute. A man identifying himself as "Simon" telephones the New York City Police Department (NYPD), claiming responsibility and threatens to detonate another bomb unless policeman John McClane is sent to Harlem wearing a sandwich board with a racist slur on it. The NYPD comply and send McClane to Harlem, where he is confronted by an electrician and shop owner named Zeus Carver. McClane explains his situation before a nearby crowd also confronts McClane over his sign. Carver intervenes and saves McClane, and they escape in a car. 

They arrive at 1 Police Plaza, where Simon demands that the pair follow a timed challenge or he will set off more bombs. They agree and McClane eventually boards the 3 train heading towards the Wall Street station in order to defuse a bomb that Simon planted on it. Carver arrives at the station before McClane finds the bomb and throws it on the tracks just as it explodes. McClane and Carver regroup with the NYPD and meet some FBI and CIA agents, who initially inform the pair that Simon is "Peter Krieg", a mercenary and former colonel in the National People's Army before revealing to them that Krieg is Simon Peter Gruber, the brother of Hans Gruber, who McClane killed years earlier in Los Angeles. 

Simon then places another call to the NYPD, informing them that he has planted an explosive in one of the city's elementary schools which is set to explode once class ends and can be triggered by the same radio frequencies utilised by law enforcement. Simon offers to give the authorities the school's location if McClane and Carver follow another timed challenge, warning that he will detonate the explosive if any evacuation attempts are carried out. While the pair solve Simon's next challenge, the NYPD begin to search all elementary schools in the city. McClane realizes that Simon is attempting to distract the NYPD away from Wall Street, which has no schools, and travels to the Federal Reserve Bank of New York Building and discovers that Simon's men have stolen $140 billion of gold bullion from there using dump trucks. He follows the trucks into a water tunnel while Carver continues Simon's challenges. 

Simon blows up a cofferdam and floods the tunnel, but McClane escapes and reunites with Carver. Surviving a car chase with Simon's men, the pair find that they were carrying enough money to pay for a bridge toll. The pair sneak aboard a tanker docked in the Long Island Sound, but Simon's associates capture them and tie them up next to a bomb. Simon explains that his school threat was fake and broadcasts a message claiming that he is planning on destroying the tanker to destabilize the Western world's economy. After he leaves, Carver and McClane free themselves and escape the tanker just before the bomb detonates. As McClane and Carver are debriefed by the NYPD, McClane informs them that none of the bullion Simon's men stole was on the tanker's cargo hold, having deduced that Simon had intended to keep all of it for himself using his knowledge of the Gruber family's modus operandi. 

While attempting to place a call to his estranged wife Holly, McClane glances at a bottle of aspirin given to him by Simon onboard the tanker and notices that it was purchased at a truck stop in the Canadian province of Quebec on the Canada–United States border. McClane informs the NYPD of his discovery, and joins them and Carver as they rush towards a warehouse near the truck stop where Simon and his men are redistributing the bullion and planning their escape. The rest of Simon's men are quickly apprehended by law enforcement personnel, though Simon and his girlfriend Katya attempt to escape in a helicopter, attacking McClane. McClane shoots at an overhead power line, which falls onto the helicopter, causing it to crash into the ground and explode. While they are celebrating their triumph, Carver persuades McClane to place another call to Holly.

Cast

Production

Development and writing
Like most of the films in the series, the premise of this film was repurposed from a stand-alone project. Various scripts were written for Die Hard 3; a number of them were ultimately rejected by Bruce Willis on the grounds that they felt like retreads of the action movies that came in the wake of the first film. One script, originally titled Troubleshooter, had McClane fighting terrorists on a Caribbean cruise line, but was rejected for being too similar to Under Siege. Troubleshooter was later repurposed for Speed 2: Cruise Control.

The script ultimately used was intended for a film entitled Simon Says, originally positioned as a Brandon Lee vehicle and the character of Zeus was written with an actress in mind. Warner Bros. bought the script and rewrote it as a Lethal Weapon sequel. Warner Bros. later put the script in turnaround, only to be purchased by Fox and rewritten as a Die Hard film.

Andy Vajna replaced Joel Silver and Larry Gordon as the producer on the film due to a fall-out with Willis. As a result, Vajna's company, Cinergi, acquired foreign rights to the film. In most regions, the film rights were acquired by Disney and Summit Entertainment, while Fox retained domestic rights. In July 1997, Cinergi sold its 50% stake in the film to Fox for $11.25 million.

Casting 
Laurence Fishburne was originally offered the co-starring role of Zeus Carver, a part also written for him, but wanted a higher fee. Producer Andy Vajna held out on the deal. Fishburne had earlier turned down the role of Jules Winnfield in Pulp Fiction, which was eventually played by Samuel L. Jackson. Fishburne was talked out of playing Jules by his representatives who wanted him to only accept leading parts, otherwise he would be stuck career-wise as a supporting actor. Subsequently, Pulp Fiction premiered at the Cannes Film Festival during the same time as Fishburne's pay negotiations. Vajna also attended the event to support Willis who was appearing in the Quentin Tarantino film. Tarantino recalled that Vajna was so impressed by Jackson's performance that he offered him the part of Carver instead. Fishburne later filed a lawsuit against Vajna's company Cinergi for reneging on a verbal agreement. The lawsuit took two years and Fishburne received a settlement.

Music

Soundtrack

RCA Victor album
Michael Kamen returned to score the third film, again incorporating other material into his score (most notably "When Johnny Comes Marching Home", not included on the soundtrack album). Excerpts from his scores for Die Hard and Die Hard 2 were also included in the new film. The soundtrack was released by RCA Victor.

La-La Land album
In 2012, La-La Land Records released a limited edition two-disc soundtrack containing the Kamen score.

Release

Theatrical
Unlike its predecessors, Die Hard with a Vengeance did not take place during Christmas. It opened in theaters on May 19, 1995, five years after Die Hard 2. Despite concerns about the film portraying bomb threats and terrorism with the Oklahoma City bombing having occurred the previous month, the film was released as originally scheduled.

Home media 
Die Hard with a Vengeance was released on VHS on December 19, 1995 along with a THX certified version. It was then released on LaserDisc on January 17, 1996, and on DVD on March 9, 1999. A special edition was released on DVD on July 10, 2001 and then re-released in February 2005 and 2007. The film was released on Blu-ray in 2007 and 2013.

Alternative ending 
An alternative ending to the one shown in the final movie was filmed with Jeremy Irons and Bruce Willis, set some time after the events in New York. It can be found on the Special Edition DVD. In this version, it is presumed that the robbery succeeds, and that McClane was used as the scapegoat for everything that went wrong. He is fired from the NYPD after more than 20 years on the force and the FBI has even taken away his pension, it is also mentioned that McClane and his wife Holley have divorced. Nevertheless, he still manages to track Simon using the batch number on the bottle of aspirins and they meet in a bar in Hungary. In this version, Simon has double-crossed most of his accomplices, gotten the loot to a safe hiding place somewhere in Hungary, and has the gold turned into statuettes of the Empire State Building in order to smuggle it out of the country. McClane is keen to take his problems out on Simon, who he invites to play a game called "McClane Says". This involves a form of Russian roulette with a small Chinese rocket launcher that has had the sights removed, meaning it is impossible to determine which end is which. McClane then asks Simon some riddles similar to the ones he played in New York. When Simon gets a riddle wrong, McClane forces him at gunpoint to fire the launcher, which fires the rocket through Simon, killing him.

In the DVD audio commentary, screenwriter Jonathan Hensleigh claims that this version was dropped because the studio thought it showed a more cruel and menacing side to McClane, a man who killed for revenge rather than in self-defense. The studio was also displeased with the lack of action in the scene, feeling that it did not fit as a "climax" and therefore chose to reshoot the finale as an action sequence at a significant monetary cost. Hensleigh's intention was to show that the events in New York and the subsequent repercussions had tilted McClane psychologically. This alternative ending, set some time after the film's main events, would have marked a serious break from the Die Hard formula, in which the plot unfolds over a period of roughly 12 hours.

According to the DVD audio commentary, a second alternative ending had McClane and Carver floating back to shore on a makeshift raft after the explosion at sea. Carver says it is a shame the bad guys are going to get away; McClane tells him not to be so sure. The scene then shifts to the plane where the terrorists find the briefcase bomb they left in the park and which Carver gave back to them (in this version it was not used to blow up the dam). The film would end on a darkly comic note as Simon asks if anyone has a four-gallon jug. This draft of the script was rejected early on – possibly due to the similarity of the ending to Die Hard 2, where all the villains board a plane that later explodes – so it was never actually filmed. The rocket-launcher sequence was the only alternative ending to be filmed.

Reception

Box office 
Die Hard with a Vengeance opened in the United States on May 19, 1995 and earned $22,162,245 in its opening weekend. In Japan, it set a record opening for 20th Century Fox with a five-day gross of $13.5 million, beating Return of the Jedi and ranking number one for five consecutive weeks, grossing over $81 million. Its opening in France set a summer record with a gross of $8.8 million in its first 8 days. The film went on to gross $100,012,499 in the United States and Canada, and $266,089,167 in other markets, giving it a total worldwide gross of $366,101,666 and making it the highest-grossing film of 1995.

Critical response 
On Rotten Tomatoes, the film has an approval rating of 58% based on 77 reviews, with an average rating of 6.10/10. The site's critical consensus reads, "Die Hard with a Vengeance gets off to a fast start and benefits from Bruce Willis and Samuel L. Jackson's barbed interplay, but clatters to a bombastic finish in a vain effort to cover for an overall lack of fresh ideas." On Metacritic, the film has a score of 58 out of 100, based on 19 critics, indicating "mixed or average reviews". Audiences polled by CinemaScore gave the film an average grade of "A−" on an A+ to F scale.

Roger Ebert of Chicago Sun-Times gave the film three stars out of four, praising the action sequences and the performances of Willis, Jackson, and Irons, concluding: "Die Hard with a Vengeance is basically a wind-up action toy, cleverly made, and delivered with high energy. It delivers just what it advertises, with a vengeance." Entertainment Weeklys Owen Gleiberman disliked the film, stating that while "[John] McTiernan stages individual sequences with great finesse... they don't add up to a taut, dread-ridden whole". 

James Berardinelli thought that the explosions and fights were "filmed with consummate skill, and are thrilling in their own right". Samuel L. Jackson's performance in the film was also praised by critics. Desson Howe of The Washington Post thought that "the best thing about the movie is the relationship between McClane and Zeus," saying that Jackson was "almost as good as he was in Pulp Fiction." For Variety, Brian Lowry wrote the film was the "least accomplished" of the Die Hard series, but "even a subpar adventure won't kill this series, as the pic's built-in audience will make it a major summer attraction, if perhaps one lacking quite the stamina of the first two movies".

Empire magazine's Ian Nathan gave the film a three out of five stars review, stating that "Die Hard with a Vengeance is better than Die Hard 2, but not as good as the peerless original. Though it's breathless fun, the film runs out of steam in the last act. And Jeremy Irons' villain isn't fit to tie Alan Rickman's shoelaces." 

In the Crime Time Filmbook, which archives various UK film reviews, the film was given a five out of five star review citing it as "...simply the best Action film of the decade, leaving imitators like Bad Boys, Executive Decision, The Rock and Chain Reaction in varying depths of shadow.

Empire considered it to be one of the 50 greatest film sequels in 2009. Ben Sherlock of Screen Rant regarded it as the best sequel of the franchise. Johnny Hoffman from Movieweb considered it a step up from the previous film and praised Willis and Jackson's chemistry and the action scenes.

Notes

References

External links 

 
 
 
 
 

1995 films
1995 action thriller films
1990s buddy cop films
1990s English-language films
1990s heist films
20th Century Fox films
American action thriller films
American buddy cop films
American films about revenge
American heist films
American sequel films
Cinergi Pictures films
Die Hard
Fictional portrayals of the New York City Police Department
Films about the New York City Police Department
Films about terrorism in the United States
Films directed by John McTiernan
Films scored by Michael Kamen
Films set in New York City
Films set in Quebec
Films shot in Connecticut
Films shot in Maryland
Films shot in New York City
Films shot in South Carolina
Films produced by John McTiernan
1990s American films